Bornu may refer to:

 Bornu Empire, a historical state of West Africa
 Borno State, Nigeria